Events from the year 2008 in Macau, China.

Incumbents
 Chief Executive - Edmund Ho
 President of the Legislative Assembly - Susana Chou

Events

February
 1 February - The opening of Ponte 16 in Santo António.
 14 February - The habeas corpus case 3/2008 was heard before the Tribunal of Ultimate Instance.

June
 15 June - 2008 Hong Kong–Macau Interport at Macau Olympic Complex.

August
 1 August - The opening of Sofitel Macau At Ponte 16.
 28 August - The premier of Zaia at The Venetian Macao.

November
 8 November - Miss International 2008 at Venetian Arena.

References

 
Years of the 21st century in Macau
Macau
Macau
2000s in Macau